The Casa de Esteban de Luca, in Buenos Aires, Argentina, is a historic house, once inhabited by the Argentine poet, soldier, Esteban de Luca, who wrote odes to General José de San Martín, as well to his victories in the battles of Chacabuco, Maipú, and other milestones in the Argentine War of Independence; his Marcha Patriótica was, briefly and until 1813, the unofficial Argentine National Anthem. De Luca was also the director of the National Munitions Works during the war, and lived in this residence until his death in 1824. The house was built in 1786 and declared a National Historic Monument in 1941. It is located at 383 Carlos Calvo Street, and currently houses a restaurant.

See also

San Telmo, Buenos Aires

References

External links
Official tourism site of the city of Buenos Aires
images of Casa at flickr.com

Buildings and structures in Buenos Aires
National Historic Monuments of Argentina
Houses completed in 1786
Houses in Argentina